The United Kingdom has three distinct legal systems with a separate prison system in each: one for both England and Wales, one for Scotland, and one for Northern Ireland.

Numbers of prisoners
The total UK prison population was 83,618 (0.088% of the population, based on the total number of people who have lived in Britain since the start time of Britains longest serving prisoner), 79,749 men and 3,869 women in 2018. Men are 22 times as likely as women to be imprisoned.  In 2019 England and Wales had the largest prison population in Western Europe.  There are calls to lock fewer people up and instead invest in creating rehabilitative environments in prisons and in the community. It is argued creating rehabilitative environments will stop crime more effectively than long prison sentences.  Policies towards prisons should be based on evidence of what works.

Prison population

People from ethnic minority backgrounds 
People from BAME (black, Asian and minority ethnic) backgrounds constitute only 14% of the general population in England and Wales, but make up 25% of its prison population. In 2017 a review led by the MP David Lammy concluded that the justice system was biased against this group, and required reform. In 2019 Lammy expressed deep concern at the extremely high proportion of BAME males in young offender institutions (51% of boys in young offender institutions were BME), saying that "England and Wales are now hitting an American scale of disproportionality in our youth justice system".

Women 
Women make up under 5% of the prison population in England and Wales. As of 2018, most were serving time for non-violent offences. There is evidence that women may be a particularly vulnerable prison population: they account for 20% of self-injury behind bars, and are twice as likely to report mental health issues as male prisoners. In 2018 the government launched a new Female Offender Strategy to try and address the needs of this particular population.

Women with a child aged under 18 months old may apply to bring their child into prison with them, if they are serving a short sentence. Women who give birth in prison may keep their baby for the first 18 months in a mother and baby unit.

Veterans
A growing number of British prisoners are former armed forces members. According to a study reported in the Guardian in 2009, 8500 former servicemen were imprisoned, making up almost 10% of the prison population.

Children and young people 
Children and young people aged under 18 are not sent to adult prisons if they are sentenced to custody. They either go to young offender institutions (for prisoners aged 15–21), secure training centres (for those aged under 17) or secure children's homes (for those aged under 15).

The number of children in custody has declined since mid-2008, from more than 3,000 to about 900 at any one time. In 2019 an independent inquiry into child sexual abuse published a report that described the scale of alleged abuse in young offender institutions and secure training centres as “shockingly high”.

Over 60
The number of British prisoners over 60 years of age rose by 130% between 2002 and 2013, a shift attributed to an increase in the convictions for historic sex abuse. The increase was reported after the 2012 commencement of Operation Yewtree, a police investigation into sexual abuse allegations—predominantly the abuse of children—against the British media personality Jimmy Savile and others. In relation to over 4,000 over-60 prisoners in UK prisons, Professor David Wilson of Birmingham City University stated in July 2014:

Four out of 10 of these prisoners (the over-60s) were convicted of sex offences and people over 60 are the fastest growing age group in the prison estate, yet there is no national strategy for the elderly who get sent to prison ... The Prison Service needs to develop a strategy to cope with this fastest growing section of the prison population or they will simply be failing in their duty of care to the elderly people that they are locking up.

In 2018 there were more than 1,500 prisoners over 70, including more than 200 aged over 80, creating increasing demands on health and social care systems.

Scotland
Scotland recognized the growth in the prison population and acted accordingly to make adjustments to how the law was carried out so that the system operates efficiently. One of the actions made was to decrease the number of stop-and-searches and between the period of June 2015 and August 2016, there was reportedly an 81% decrease in those actions when statistics from 2014 were compared.

Drug abusers
The proportion of prisoners developing a drug abuse problem while incarcerated rose from 8.4% in 2013-2014 to nearly 15% in 2018–2019.  Much of the prison system is badly equipped to disrupt illegal drug supply and security standards vary between prisons.  Reform maintains prisons are overcrowded, staff retention is poor and using community sentences instead of prison for minor offenses would help.  Aidan Shilson-Thomas of Reform said, “There must always be a place in prison for those who commit serious crimes. However, prison must also be an opportunity for inmates to change their behaviour.  Stabilising the system means stemming the flow of drugs, reducing overcrowding, fixing the crumbling estate and improving officer retention. Its long-term sustainability requires a serious conversation about how many people we lock up and for how long. Failing to act will mean poorer social outcomes, more reoffending and ultimately huge costs to the taxpayer.”

See also 
List of countries by incarceration rate

References

External links
HM Prison Service - England and Wales
Scottish Prison Service
Northern Ireland Prison Service

Imprisonment and detention
Incarceration rates
Prison population